Walter Edward Weir (born June 3, 1954) is a Canadian former professional ice hockey player who played 320 games in the National Hockey League from 1979 to 1985 and 150 games in the World Hockey Association from 1976 to 1979.

Weir was born in Verdun, Quebec.  He played for the Quebec Nordiques, Hartford Whalers, and Pittsburgh Penguins.

Career statistics

Regular season and playoffs

External links 
 

1954 births
Living people
Beauce Jaros players
Canadian ice hockey defencemen
Hartford Whalers players
Ice hockey people from Montreal
People from Verdun, Quebec
Pittsburgh Penguins players
Quebec Nordiques players
Quebec Nordiques (WHA) players
Stanley Cup champions
Undrafted National Hockey League players